Cape Bon ("Good Cape") is a peninsula in far northeastern Tunisia, also known as Ras at-Taib, Sharīk Peninsula, or Watan el Kibli;
Cape Bon is also the name of the northernmost point on the peninsula, also known as Ras ed-Dar, and known in antiquity as the Cape of Mercury or Cape Hermaeum.

Peninsula

The peninsula's northern shore forms the southern end of the Gulf of Tunis, while its southern shore is on the Gulf of Hammamet.

The peninsula is administered as the country's Nabeul Governorate.

Settlements on the peninsula include Nabeul, Hammam el ghezaz, El Haouaria, Kelibia, Menzel Temime, Korba, and Beni Khalled. Rivers include the Melah and Chiba wadis. Mountains include Kef Bou Krim, Kef er-Rend, Djebel Sidi Abd er-Rahmane, Djebel Hofra, and Djebel Reba el-Aine. Besides Cape Bon, other headlands on the peninsula are Ras Dourdas and Ras el-Fortass on the northern shore, Ras el-Melah on the short eastern shore, and Ras Mostefa and Ras Maamoura on the southern shore.

The ruins of the Punic town Kerkouane are also located here. Djebel Mlezza ("MtMlessa") has tombs from the time of Agathocles, which were excavated just before the First World War.

See also
 Battles of Cape Bon in 468 and in 1941
 El Brij, Tunisia 
 Sidi Rais
 Korbous

References

Peninsulas of Tunisia
Bon